Jacob Whittle (born 25 September 2004) is a British competitive swimmer from Alfreton who specializes in freestyle swimming.

In 2020 he joined as the youngest member of the New York Breakers in the International Swimming League as a professional athlete. Whittle was included in April 2021 as a member of the British team to go to the postponed 2020 Olympics in Tokyo. He joined an "exceptionally high quality" swimming team which included Sarah Vasey, Abbie Wood and Molly Renshaw who are all from Derbyshire and also at their first Olympics.

References

External links

2004 births
Living people
British male swimmers
British male freestyle swimmers
European Aquatics Championships medalists in swimming
Swimmers at the 2020 Summer Olympics
Olympic swimmers of Great Britain
World Aquatics Championships medalists in swimming
Swimmers at the 2022 Commonwealth Games
Commonwealth Games medallists in swimming
Commonwealth Games gold medallists for England
Commonwealth Games silver medallists for England
21st-century British people
Sportspeople from Derbyshire
People from Alfreton
Medallists at the 2022 Commonwealth Games